Sergei Valeryevich Ivanov (born 5 March 1975 in Chuvashia, Soviet Union) is a former professional road bicycle racer, who competed between 1996 and 2011. In this time he completed in five Grand Tours, and also won six national championship titles. He also won the Tour de Pologne 1998. He now lives in Bekkevoort, Belgium.

Major results

1995
 1st  Overall Tour de Hongrie
 1st  Overall Vuelta Ciclista a Navarra
1996
 2nd Overall Tour de l'Avenir
1st  Points classification
1st  Mountain classification
1st Stages 5 & 10
 3rd Overall Course de la Paix
 3rd Route Adélie de Vitré
 4th Overall Tour de Normandie
1997
 6th Brussels–Ingooigem
 9th Tour de Berne
 10th Overall Circuit Cycliste Sarthe – Pays de la Loire
1998
 1st  Road race, National Road Championships
 1st  Overall Tour de Pologne
1st Stages 5 & 8
 1st Brussels–Ingooigem
 2nd GP du canton d'Argovie
 7th Overall Circuit Cycliste Sarthe – Pays de la Loire
 9th Overall GP Tell
1999
 1st  Road race, National Road Championships
 1st Druivenkoers Overijse
 2nd Overall Tour de Langkawi
 2nd La Côte Picarde
 3rd GP Ouest–France
 4th Rund um den Henninger Turm
 10th Overall Circuit Cycliste Sarthe – Pays de la Loire
1st Stage 2
2000
 1st  Road race, National Road Championships
 1st E3 Prijs Vlaanderen
 3rd Overall KBC Driedaagse van De Panne-Koksijde
 3rd Overall Tour de Pologne
1st Stages 6 & 7
 4th Overall Tour de Luxembourg
 5th Milan–San Remo
 7th Paris–Camembert
2001
 1st Stage 9 Tour de France
 1st Stage 5 Tour de Suisse
 1st Stage 4 Giro della Liguria
 3rd Trofeo Pantalica
 9th Overall Tour de Luxembourg
 9th Kuurne–Brussels–Kuurne
2002
 1st Trofeo Luis Puig
 2nd Amstel Gold Race
 3rd Rund um den Henninger Turm
 7th Overall Ronde van Nederland
1st Stage 5
 10th GP du Midi-Libre
2003
 1st Stage 5 Tour de Luxembourg
 1st Stage 6 TTT Tour Méditerranéen
 3rd GP du canton d'Argovie
 4th Coppa Bernocchi
 7th Tour of Flanders
 10th Paris–Roubaix
 10th Rund um den Henninger Turm
2004
 8th Amstel Gold Race
2005
 1st  Road race, National Road Championships
 1st Stage 4 Tour of Britain
 9th Tour of Flanders
 10th Eneco Tour
2006
 8th GP Ouest–France
 9th La Flèche Wallonne
 10th Amstel Gold Race
2008
 1st  National Road Race Championships
 1st  Overall Tour de Wallonie
 3rd Overall Driedaagse van West-Vlaanderen
 3rd Overall Tour of Belgium
 7th Amstel Gold Race
2009
 1st Amstel Gold Race
 1st  National Road Race Championships
 1st Stage 14 Tour de France
 5th Liège–Bastogne–Liège
 7th Clásica de San Sebastián
 9th Overall Tour of Belgium
1st Stage 1
2010
 1st  Points classification, Tour of Luxembourg

References

External links
 Palmares on Cycling Base

Russian male cyclists
Russian Tour de France stage winners
1975 births
Living people
Cyclists at the 2000 Summer Olympics
Cyclists at the 2008 Summer Olympics
Olympic cyclists of Russia
People from Cheboksary
Tour de Suisse stage winners
Sportspeople from Chuvashia